Pensarn (or Pen-sarn) is a small village in the Ardudwy area of Gwynedd, Wales. It is situated on the coastal road between Llanbedr and Harlech.

There is an unstaffed halt on the Cambrian Coast Railway and the Christian Mountain Centre (CMC) which is housed in the old Pensarn Wharf buildings.

Villages in Gwynedd
Llanfair, Gwynedd
Villages in Snowdonia